XML Base is a World Wide Web Consortium recommended facility for defining base URIs, for resolving relative URIs, in parts of XML documents.

XML Base recommendation was adopted on 2001-06-27.

References

External links
 XML Base W3C Recommendation

XML
World Wide Web Consortium standards